CION-FM is a French-language Canadian radio station located in Quebec City, Quebec.

Owned and operated by the Fondation Radio Galilée, it broadcasts on 90.9 MHz with an effective radiated power of 5,865 watts (class B) using an omnidirectional antenna. The station's transmitter is located at Mount Bélair.

The station has a religious broadcasting (Christian) format since it went on the air on September 19, 1995, and identifies itself as "Radio Galilée".

Transmitters

References

External links 
Radio Galilée
 

Ion
Ion
Ion
Radio stations established in 1995
1995 establishments in Quebec